Gowharan District is a district (bakhsh) in Bashagard County, Hormozgan Province, Iran. At the 2006 census, its population was 13,017, in 2,906 families.  The District has one city Gowharan.  The District has one rural district (dehestan): Gowharan Rural District.

References 

Districts of Hormozgan Province
Bashagard County